The  is a suburban electric multiple unit (EMU) train type introduced in 1985 by the Japanese National Railways (JNR). It is operated by East Japan Railway Company (JR East) and Central Japan Railway Company (JR Central). It was formerly operated by West Japan Railway Company (JR-West) in Japan.

Design
The 211 series was developed by JNR to replace older 113 series and 115 series trains. The 211 series incorporated regenerative brakes and stainless steel body construction.

Variants
 211-0 series (basic version with transverse seating)
 211-1000 series (cold region version with transverse seating)
 211-2000 series (basic version with all longitudinal seating)
 211-3000 series (cold region version with all longitudinal seating)
 211-5000 series (JR Central version)
 211-6000 series (JR Central version with single motored car)
 Joyful Train variants (JR West version)

Operations

211-0, 211-2000 series
 Tōkaidō Main Line and Ito Line: Tokyo – Numazu/Ito (From 1986 - April 2012)
 Tōkaidō Main Line: Hamamatsu – Maibara
 Chūō Main Line: Tachikawa – Shiojiri
 Shinonoi Line: Shiojiri – Shinonoi
 Shinetsu Line: Shinonoi – Nagano

211-1000, 211-3000 series
 Tohoku Main Line: Oyama – Utsunomiya
 Takasaki Line: Ueno - Takasaki (1986 - March 2014)
 Ryomo Line: Takasaki – Oyama
 Shinetsu Line: Takasaki – Yokokawa
 Oito Line: Matsumoto –Shinano-Omachi
 Chuo Main Line: Tachikawa – Shiojiri/Shiojiri – Nakatsugawa
 Shinonoi Line: Shiojiri – Shinonoi
 Shinetsu Main Line: Shinonoi – Nagano
 Sobu Main Line: Chiba – Chōshi (via Yachimata) (21 October 2006 – 2012)
 Narita Line: Chiba – Chōshi (via Narita) (21 October 2006 – 2012)
 Kashima Line: Sawara – Kashima-Jingu (21 October 2006 – 2012)
 Togane Line (since 21 October 2006 – 2012)
 Uchibo Line: Chiba – Awa-Kamogawa (via Kisarazu) (21 October 2006 – 2012)
 Sotobo Line: Chiba – Awa-Kamogawa (via Katsuura) (21 October 2006 – 2012)
 Iida Line (since 15 March 2014)
 Agatsuma Line (since 22 August 2016)
 Joetsu Line: Takasaki - Minakami (since 23 August 2016)

211-5000, 211-6000 series
 Tokaido Main Line: Atami – Maibara
 Chuo Main Line: Nagoya – Nagiso
 Kansai Main Line: Nagoya – Kameyama
 Aichi Loop Line: Kozoji – Okazaki

Joyful Train sets

 Super Saloon Yumeji: Three-car set converted from 211 and 213 series coaches which entered service in 1988 and withdrawn in March 2010. Operated by JR-West and based at Okayama Depot.

See also
 213 series
 311 series

References

External links

 JR East 211 series 
 JR Central 211 series information 

Electric multiple units of Japan
East Japan Railway Company
Central Japan Railway Company
West Japan Railway Company
Train-related introductions in 1985
Kawasaki multiple units
Kinki Sharyo multiple units
Hitachi multiple units
Nippon Sharyo multiple units
Tokyu Car multiple units
1500 V DC multiple units of Japan